The 1989 West Papua earthquake struck Papua, Indonesia – then Irian Jaya province – on August 1 with a moment magnitude of 6.0 and a maximum Mercalli intensity of VIII (Severe). Around 120 people were killed, mainly due to landslides and mudslides.

Details and relief 
The West Papua earthquake struck at 9:17 local time and measured  5.7 and 6.0 on the moment magnitude scale. There were multiple aftershocks.

The earthquake killed 120 people and left 120 injured; all of the dead were recovered from the villages of Holuon, Pasema, and Soba. Many of these deaths and injuries derived from landslides that covered two villages and disrupted sections of the Baliem River, practically flooding three villages and depositing tons of mud. A large portion of the dead consisted of Dhani tribesmen.

Local authorities distributed food, blankets, clothing, and money to survivors. Helicopters supplied food and other relief supplies, but they were slowed by cracks in the local airstrips. More than 25 survivors were treated for severe injuries and another 100 for less grave maladies. Between 200 and 300 people were evacuated in the aftermath of the tremor, and 3,500 Hupla people were resettled at a lower altitude, thus moving them from their traditional settlements.

Geology 
The focal mechanism for the earthquake demonstrated reverse faulting. The region around the epicenter has a history of powerful earthquakes. Between two earthquakes in 1976 and 1981, 1000 people died. There have been large earthquakes in the region as recently as 2009 and 2010.

See also 
List of earthquakes in 1989
List of earthquakes in Indonesia

References

Sources

External links 

1989 earthquakes
1989 in Indonesia
1989 in science
Earthquakes in Indonesia
August 1989 events in Asia
1989 disasters in Indonesia